Star of Midnight is a 1935 American mystery comedy film directed by Stephen Roberts. William Powell was loaned out to RKO Pictures from MGM to star with Ginger Rogers.

Plot
New York lawyer and playboy Clay "Dal" Dalzell (William Powell) is asked by old friend Tim Winthrop (Leslie Fenton) to locate his girlfriend Alice, who mysteriously disappeared in Chicago a year ago. Winthrop cannot stop thinking about her and believes she is in New York.

Along with Donna Mantin (Ginger Rogers), who has romantic designs on him, "Dal" attends a hit stage show called "Midnight" that stars a masked actress, Mary Smith (Bess Flowers), who vanishes in mid-performance when Winthrop recognizes her and blurts out the name Alice.

Gossip columnist Tommy Tennant (Russell Hopton) claims to have discovered a vital clue to the mystery, but before he can reveal it, he is shot in Dal's suite. Dal is the main suspect, but Inspector Doremus (J. Farrell MacDonald) does not believe him to be guilty, and gives the resourceful lawyer the freedom to investigate on his own.

Dal negotiates with gangster Kinland to retrieve letters embarrassing to Donna. When he gets them (using a bit of blackmail), he is annoyed to discover that they actually belong to a friend of Donna's.

Dal is visited by an old flame, Jerry (Vivien Oakland), now wed to a lawyer named Classon (Ralph Morgan). Classon, it turns out, is also searching for Alice; she can provide an alibi for his client, convicted of a murder in Chicago.

Dal sets up a trap in a Greenwich Village apartment, pretending to have located the missing Mary there and notifying each of the suspects that she is leaving there to meet him at his suite. He reasons that those who are innocent will go to his suite, while the murderer heads to the apartment to silence Mary.

The killer indeed turns up, in disguise, putting Dal and Donna in grave danger. Fortunately, Dal and Inspector Doremus are able to subdue the culprit. It is Robert Classon. It turns out that Jerry had carried on affairs, first with the Chicago murder victim, then with his accused killer. Robert Classon killed one of his wife's lovers and tried to frame the other. To achieve the latter, he also needed to silence Alice, unaware that she had fled to avoid testifying. She hated the convicted man for ruining her father.

With everything wrapped up, Dal finally gives in and marries Donna.

Cast
 William Powell as Clay "Dal" Dalzell
 Ginger Rogers as Donna Mantin
 Paul Kelly as Jim Kinland
 Gene Lockhart as Horace Swayne, Dal's butler
 Ralph Morgan as Robert Classon
 Leslie Fenton as Tim Winthrop
 J. Farrell MacDonald as Police Inspector Doremus
 Russell Hopton as Tommy Tennant
 Vivien Oakland as Jerry Classon
 Robert Emmett O'Connor as Police Sergeant Clearey
 Bess Flowers as Mary Smith (uncredited)
 George Chandler as Theatre Usher that Swayne brings up to Dal's apartment (uncredited)

Reception
In his New York Times review, Andre Sennwald called it a "sleek, witty and engaging entertainment". Noting the similarities to the previous year's The Thin Man (also starring Powell as a debonaire detective), however, Sennwald concluded "it is never quite as satisfying as its illustrious predecessor." Writing for The Spectator, Graham Greene also drew comparisons between the film's craftsmanship and that of The Thin Man (as well as The Trunk Mystery), describing Star of Midnight as "a light, quick, sophisticated comedy ... all suavity and amusement, pistol-shots and cocktails".

The film was popular and earned RKO a profit of $265,000.

Home media
Star of Midnight has been released on VHS as part of the RKO Collection and on DVD in Italy (region 2) as La Maschera Di Mezzanotte, with Italian and English soundtracks.

References

External links
 
 
 
 

1935 films
1930s mystery films
American mystery films
American black-and-white films
Films directed by Stephen Roberts
RKO Pictures films
1930s English-language films
1930s American films